Arizona Baby (stylized in all caps) is the third studio album by American rapper Kevin Abstract, released on April 25, 2019 by Question Everything, Inc. through RCA Records. The album was released cumulatively, with the eponymous first part (stylized as ARIZONA baby) released on April 11, followed by a second part titled Ghettobaby on April 18. It was primarily produced by Jack Antonoff and Abstract's fellow Brockhampton member Romil Hemnani, with several other members of Brockhampton providing additional production, vocals, and instrumentation.

Release and promotion
Kevin Abstract teased the project in March 2019, sharing its artwork without explanation. On April 8, a music video for "Big Wheels" was released, under the video title "The 1-9-9-9 is Coming", alongside an image teasing the dates April 11, April 18 and April 25. On April 11, following a teaser video for "Georgia" the three-song project was released, with Ghettobaby announced to be forthcoming. On April 16 Abstract clarified that Arizona Baby would be his second full-length album, being released gradually. Ghettobaby was released on April 18, including the previously released music alongside three new tracks, and was promoted by a music video for "Baby Boy". The complete album was released on April 25, following a music video for "Peach".

Music and lyrics
Abstract has cited Lana Del Rey's "Venice Bitch" (also co-produced by Antonoff) as inspiring the album, as well as "Westcoast Collective" by American rapper Dominic Fike, who appeared on the final album.

The first part of Arizona Baby was described as "stand[ing] on the cutting edge of modern hip-hop", taking an experimental approach to pop songwriting. The album juxtaposes gentle vocoders and acoustic guitars against "galloping" production and rapping. "Big Wheels" features "sparkling synths and skittering beats", and has been compared to Abstract's hip hop work with Brockhampton, while "Joy Ride" is built around trumpets and has been noted to demonstrate producer Jack Antonoff's influence. "Georgia" has been described as tender and nostalgic.

Ghettobaby, the album's second part has been described as increasingly personal, discussing Abstract's childhood, former friendships and insecurity, and featuring mostly sung R&B-hip hop fusions. "Corpus Christi" contains a reference to former Brockhampton member Ameer Vann, who was fired from the group following domestic abuse allegations. "Baby Boy" is a psychedelic rock song, with plucked guitar and distant synthesizers.

Critical reception

Part one

Hannah Mylrea of NME described the project as "short-but-sweet", praising its polished and focused nature compared to Abstract's previous work with Brockhampton, and describing it as "a neat reminder of [his] talent". For The Line of Best Fit, Sophie Walker wrote that the album "demonstrates [Abstract's] chameleon-like talent for creating everything from the most infectious beats to the gentlest verses".

Track listing
The album's parts were released cumulatively, meaning Ghettobaby also includes part one, and the final release includes all three parts, without a specified distinction between each part.

Personnel
Credits adapted from Tidal.

Musicians
 Kevin Abstract – keyboards , programming 
 Austin Anderson – keyboards 
 Jack Antonoff – keyboards , programming , guitar , drums , percussion , bass , piano , organ , background vocals 
 Bearface – background vocals 
 Ryan Beatty – vocals , background vocals 
 Russell "Joba" Boring – background vocals , bass 
 Dominic Fike – background vocals , guitar 
 Romil Hemnani – keyboards , programming , guitar , piano 
 Cole Kamen-Green – trumpet 
 Evan Smith – saxophone , flute 

Engineers
 Jack Antonoff – mixing 
 Brandon Boost – engineering 
 Tom Elmhirst – mixing 
 Romil Hemnani – recording 
 Vlado Meller – mastering 
 John Rooney – assistance 
 Laura Sisk – recording 
 Eli Walker – recording

Charts

Release history

References

Kevin Abstract albums
2019 albums
Hip hop albums by American artists
RCA Records albums
Albums produced by Jack Antonoff